Associazione Sportiva Dilettantistica Imperia commonly referred to as simply Imperia (formerly A.S.D. Pro Imperia), is an Italian association football club located in Imperia, Liguria and since 13 July 2012, after the disappearance from football of the former Imperia Calcio, the club is the main team of the city.

In the 2011–12 season the club has played in Serie D after promotion from Eccellenza Liguria.

In the 2011–12 and in the 2012–13 seasons in Serie D, when the club was relegated to Eccellenza Liguria, it has been the team more representative of the province of Imperia.

Predecessors

From U.S. Imperia to A.S.D. Imperia Calcio

The origins of football in Imperia go back to 1923 when was founded Unione Sportiva Imperia and refounded in 1987 as A.S. Imperia '87.

History

From A.S.D. RivieraPontedassio 2006 to A.S.D. Imperia

A.S.D. RivieraPontedassio 2006 
The club was founded in 2006 as A.S.D. RivieraPontedassio 2006 after the merger with Riviera Calcio Imperia (founded in 1970) and Valle Impero Pontedassio, a club born in 1983.

From P.R.O. Imperia to Pro Imperia

From Prima Categoria to Serie D 
In 2008 the club merged with Onegliese and SanBart 80 and changed its name in A.S.D. P.R.O. Imperia. P.R.O stands for Pontedassio, Riviera and Onegliese. In 2010 the club changed its name to A.S.D. Pro Imperia and was promoted to Serie D in the 2010–11 season, obtained by winning the promotion play-off of Eccellenza Liguria, after an ascent started in Prima Categoria in the 2008–09 season.

A.S.D. Imperia 
On 13 July 2012 the club was renamed A.S.D. Imperia following the disappearance from football of the former Imperia.

Colors and badge
Since 13 July 2012 the team has changed its colors from white (the historic color of Riviera Calcio), black and blue to black and blue (the traditional colors of former Imperia).

Honours
Serie D
Winners: 1969–70 (group A), 1977–78 (group A), 1980–81 (group A)
Campionato Nazionale Dilettanti
Winners: 1998–99 (group A)
Eccellenza Liguria
Winners: 2005–06, 2019–20
Prima Categoria
Winners: 2009–10 (group A)
Seconda Categoria
Winners: 2008–09 (group A)

References

External links
 Official Site 

Football clubs in Liguria
Association football clubs established in 2006
2006 establishments in Italy
Imperia